The 2017 Indiana Hoosiers football team represented Indiana University in the 2017 NCAA Division I FBS football season. The Hoosiers played their home games at Memorial Stadium in Bloomington, Indiana. Indiana competed as a member of the East Division of the Big Ten Conference. The team was led by first-year head coach Tom Allen and finished 5–7 overall, 2–7 in Big Ten play to finish in a tie for sixth place in the East Division.

Spring Game
The 2017 Spring Game took place in Bloomington, on April 13, at 7:00 PM.

Previous season

The Hoosiers finished the 2016 season 6–6, 4–5 in Big Ten play to finish in fourth place in the Eastern Division. The highlight of the season was beating No. 17-ranked Michigan State, as well as beating Purdue to become bowl eligible for the second year in a row; a feat last accomplished in the 1990 and 1991 seasons. Following a loss to Utah in the Foster Farms Bowl, Indiana finished their season 6–7.

Offseason 
Following the season, the Hoosiers would fire sixth year Offensive Coordinator Kevin Johns on January 2, 2017 and hire Tennessee Offensive Coordinator Mike DeBord two days later. On January 4, 2017, Grant Heard joined the Hoosiers' coaching staff as the wide receivers coach. He formerly coached at Ole Miss. On March 3, 2017, Mike Hart was hired to fill the vacant role of running backs' coach. Hart was a former running backs coach at Syracuse, Western Michigan and Eastern Michigan, as well as a former running back for the Indianapolis Colts.

Departures
Notable departures from the 2016 squad included:

2017 NFL Draft

Hoosiers who were picked in the 2017 NFL Draft:

Preseason

Position key

Recruits

The Hoosiers signed a total of 23 recruits.

Returning starters
Indiana had seven returning players on offense, nine on defense and two on special teams that started games in 2016.

Offense

Defense

Special teams

Schedule
The Hoosiers' 2017 schedule consisted of 6 home games and 6 away games. The Hoosiers first non-conference game were away at Virginia of the Atlantic Coast Conference (ACC), before hosting the remaining two non-conference games; against FIU from Conference USA (C-USA) and against Georgia Southern of the Sun Belt Conference (Sun Belt).

The Hoosiers played nine conference games; they hosted Ohio State, Michigan, Wisconsin, and Rutgers. They traveled to Penn State, Michigan State, Maryland, Illinois, and Purdue.

 ESPN's College GameDay was held in Bloomington for the first time in the show's broadcast history.
The game between FIU and Indiana, originally scheduled for 3:30 p.m., was cancelled due to Hurricane Irma. The cancelled game scheduled for September 16 will serve as Indiana's bye week, with a replacement game added on October 7 against Charleston Southern University.

Roster

Game summaries

vs No. 2 Ohio State

at Virginia

vs Georgia Southern

at No. 4 Penn State

vs Charleston Southern (FCS)

vs No. 17 Michigan

at No. 18 Michigan State

at Maryland

vs No. 9 Wisconsin

at Illinois

vs Rutgers

at Purdue

Statistics

Team

Offense

Defense

Special teams

Scores by quarter (all opponents)

Scores by quarter (B1G opponents)

Awards and honors

Preseason awards / Watch list

Players of the Week

B1G Conference Awards

Radio
Radio coverage for all games will be broadcast on IUHoosiers.com All-Access and on various radio frequencies throughout the state. The primary radio announcer is long-time broadcaster Don Fischer with Play-by-Play.

Players in the 2018 NFL Draft

References

Indiana
Indiana Hoosiers football seasons
Indiana Hoosiers football